The RTÉ/Irish Sports Council Hall of Fame Award is an award given annually as part of the RTÉ Sports Awards ceremony each December. The award is given to a sportsperson who has made a major impact on the world of sport during their lifetime. The winner is selected by RTÉ Sport.

The most recent winner, in 2022, was Jimmy Barry-Murphy.

Winners

By year

References

RTÉ Sport
Irish sports trophies and awards
Halls of fame in the Republic of Ireland
All-sports halls of fame
Awards established in 2006